Korea has a variety of fortresses, including sanseong (mountain fortress), jinseong (camp fortress), and eupseong (city fortress). This is a list of notable fortresses.

Ancient 

 Hwando Fortress (Hangul: 위나암성 Hanja: 尉那巖城) present-day Wandu 丸都)
 Sanggyeong (Hangul: 상경용천부 Hanja :上京龍泉府) present-day Ning'an 寧安市 渤海鎭, capital of Balhae
 Hwangryong Fortress (Hangul: 황룡산성 Hanja: 皇龍山城)
 Achasanseong (Hangul: 아차산성 Hanja: 阿且山城)  
 Namhansanseong (Hangul: 남한산성 Hanja: 南漢山城)
 Busosanseong Fortress, Buyeo (Hangul: 부여 부소산성 Hanja: 扶餘 扶蘇山城) present-day Buyeo, third capital of Baekje.
 Wiryeseong (Hangul: 위례성 Hanja: 慰禮城) present-day Seoul, first capital of Baekje.
 Seoul Mongchontoseong (Hangul: 서울 몽촌토성 Hanja: 서울 蒙村土城)
 Seoul Pungnap-dong Toseong (Hangul: 서울 풍납동 토성 Hanja: 서울 風納洞 土城)
 Gyeongju Wolseong (Hangul: 경주 월성 Hanja: 慶州 月城)
 Samnyeon Sanseong Fortress, Boeun (Hangul: 보은 삼년산성 Hanja: 報恩 三年山城)
 Doksan Fortress (Hangul: 독산성 Hanja: 禿山城) present-day Osan

Joseon Dynasty 

Castles in Korea
Korea geography-related lists